The Ahmednagar Fort (Ahmadnagar Qilaa) is a fort located near to the Bhingar Nala near Ahmednagar in Maharashtra. It was the headquarters of the Ahmednagar Sultanate. In 1803, it was taken by the British during the Second Anglo-Maratha War. It was used as a prison during the British Raj. Currently, the fort is under the administration of the Armoured Corps of the Indian Army.

Major features 

In 1803 the Ahmednagar Fort was round in appearance, with twenty-four bastions, one large gate, and three small sally ports. The berm was only about one yard wide. The rampart was of black hewn stone; the parapet of brick in chunam, and both together appeared from the crest of the glacis to be only as high as the pole of a field-officer's tent. The bastions were all about  feet higher; they were round. One of them mounted eight guns en barbet, pointing eastward; all the rest had jingies, four in each. In 1803 two guns were visible in each bastion, and 200 were said to be ready in the fort to be mounted.

A gunshot to the west of the fort was the Pettah of Ahmednagar. The main gate of the fort faced the pettah, and was defended by a small half-circular work, with one traverse and several little towers for men. There was a wooden bridge over the ditch, which could be taken away in time of war, but it was not a drawbridge. It was reported that an iron trough as large as the bridge, could be placed upon it, or on the supporters of it, and fill with charcoal or other combustibles, to which could be ignited as an enemy approached. The fort is also called as Bhuikot Killa which means it is a land fort and is not constructed on any hill. It should not be confused with other Bhuikot Killas in Maharashtra like Solapur Bhuikot Killa.

A small river came from the northward, round the west side of the pettah, and passed to the southward of the fort. A nullah also passed from the northward, between the fort and a town called Bhingar, about a gunshot to the eastward, and joined the river. A potential defensive weakness was a little hill or rising ground close to and east of Bhingar, from which shot from siege guns could reach the fort.

Two nills or covered aqueducts came from the hills, a mile or more to the north, passed through and supplied the pettah and the town, and then went into the fort, either under or through the ditch, into which the wastewater fell.

There were no passages across the ditch from the sally ports, and no part of the aqueducts appeared above the ditch. The nullah mentioned above had steep banks and passed within 60 yards of the fort; the aqueduct from Bhingar passed under it. There was no bridge or even a prominent crossing point at the nullah and hence no clearly defined route between the fort and the town of Bhingar.

There were many small pagodas and mosques around the pettah and the fort, but none exactly between, or between the fort and Bhingar, or nearer to the fort than those towns.

History 

The fort was built by Malik Ahmad Nizam Shah I (after whom the city of Ahmednagar is named) in 1427. He was the first sultan of the Nizam Shahi dynasty and he built the fort to defend the city against invaders from neighbouring Idar. Initially it was made of mud but major fortification began in 1559 under Hussain Nizam Shah. It took four years and was finally finished in 1562.  In February 1596, Chand Bibi the queen regent successfully repulsed the Mughal invasion but when Akbar attacked again in 1600 the fort went to the Mughals. 

Aurangzeb died at Ahmednagar fort at the age of 88 on 20 February 1707. After Aurangzeb's death, the fort passed to the Nizams in 1724, to Marathas in 1759 and later the Scindias in 1790. During the period of instability in the Maratha Empire following the death of Madhavrao II, Daulat Scindia had the fort and its surrounding region ceded to him. In 1797, he imprisoned Nana Phadanvis the Peshwa diplomat at Ahmednagar fort.

In 1803 during the Second Anglo-Maratha War, Arthur Wellesley defeated the Maratha forces and the East India Company came into possession of the fort.

Modern era
The fort was known as Ahmednagar Fort and was used by the British Raj as a prison and this was where Jawaharlal Nehru, Abul Kalam Azad, Sardar Patel and nine other members of the Indian National Congress were detained for almost three years after they passed the Quit India Resolution. Jawaharlal Nehru wrote his popular book -the Discovery of India- while he was imprisoned at the fort. During the same time, Congress leader, Maulana Abul Kalam Azad also compiled his acclaimed "Ghubar-e-Khatir" (Sallies of Mind) which is considered as the best example of "Epistolary Essays" in Urdu literature.

During the same time, Odisha's first Chief-Minister and ex-Governor of undivided Bombay State, Harekrushna Mahatab also compiled three volumes of History of Odisha in Odia. This has later been translated and published in English and Hindi.

Currently, the fort is under the administration of the Armoured Corps of the Indian Army.

Gallery

See also
 List of forts in Maharashtra

References

Forts in Maharashtra
Ahmednagar
Tourist attractions in Ahmednagar district
16th-century forts in India